Diplolaemus leopardinus, commonly known as the leopard iguana or the leopard grumbler, is a species of lizard native to the southern tip of South America.

Geographic range
It is found in the Patagonian Desert and in the Araucanía Region of Argentina and Chile.

Description
The leopard iguana has a broad, triangular head and strong jaws. It is a medium-brown colour with bands of darker brown blotches.

Diet
Its diet mostly consists of insects and other small invertebrates.

Habitat

References

Further reading
 Werner F. 1898. "Die Reptilien und Batrachier der Sammlung Plate". Zoologische Jahrbücher. Supplement - Band IV. Fauna Chiliensis, Erster Band. (Jena, Germany: Gustav Fischer). pp. 244–278 + Plates 13 & 14. ("Liosaurus leopardinus n. sp.", pp. 248–249 + Plate 13, Figures 1 & 1b).

Diplolaemus
Lizards of South America
Reptiles of Argentina
Reptiles of Chile
Fauna of Patagonia
Reptiles described in 1898
Taxa named by Franz Werner